Rudolph J. Heinemann, also known as Rudolf J. Heinemann, (1901 – February 7, 1975) was a German-born American art dealer and collector of Old Masters. He was an advisor to Baron Hans Heinrich Thyssen-Bornemisza, who established a museum in Lugano, Switzerland with his help. Heinemann and later, his wife Lore, donated works of art to the Metropolitan Museum of Art, the Frick Collection, the National Gallery of Art and the Morgan Library & Museum.

Early life
Heinemann was born in 1901 in Germany. His father and grandfather were art dealers. He was educated in Munich, Berlin and Florence.

Career
Heinemann began his career as an assistant at the Galerie Heinemann in Munich, owned by his father. After his father's death in 1931, he became the owner of the gallery. He emigrated to the United States in 1935, he established his own art gallery in New York City. His clients included institutions like the Museum of Fine Arts in Boston, to whom he sold Time Unveiling Truth by Giovanni Battista Tiepolo in 1961.

Heinemann was an advisor to Baron Hans Heinrich Thyssen-Bornemisza. It was under Heinemann's expertise that Baron Thyssen-Bornemisza established the Thyssen Museum in Lugano, Switzerland. (The museum collection was later moved to the Thyssen-Bornemisza Museum in Madrid, Spain.) Heinemann served on the board of the New York University Institute of Fine Arts.

Heinemann collected Old Masters. According to The New York Times, it became "one of the finest collections of Old Master paintings and drawings in private hands." With his wife, Heinemann donated works of art to the Metropolitan Museum of Art, the National Gallery of Art and the Morgan Library & Museum. A painting by Hans Baldung Grien that Heinemann had donated to the Zimmerli Art Museum at Rutgers University in New Brunswick, N.J., had to be restituted to the Goodman/Gutmann family when it was found to have been looted by Nazis from a Jewish collector murdered in the Holocaust.

In 2015, an El Greco painting which had passed through Heinemann's Pinakos Gallery, Portrait of a Gentleman, was restituted to the heirs of Julius Priester, after the painting's false provenance was discovered to conceal Nazi looting of the Priester collection. Heinemann had purchased the El Greco from art dealer Frederick Mont.

Personal life and death
Heinemann married Loretta Leiter. They resided at 907 Fifth Avenue on the Upper East Side of Manhattan. Heinemann became a naturalized U.S. citizen in 1941. Lore Heinemann donated Tiepolo drawings to the Morgan Library. Rudolf and Lore Heinemann also made donations to the National Gallery of Art and the Metropolitan Museum of Art. 

Heinemann died on February 7, 1975, in Lugano, Switzerland.

References

1901 births
1975 deaths
German emigrants to the United States
People with acquired American citizenship
People from the Upper East Side
American art dealers
American art collectors